Mount Allan Thomson is a conspicuous mountain surmounted by a dark peak over 1,400 m which stands at the north side of Mackay Glacier, about 3 nautical miles (6 km) west of the mouth of Cleveland Glacier in Victoria Land. Charted and named by the British Antarctic Expedition (1910–13) for J. Allan Thomson, British geologist who assisted in writing the scientific reports of the British Antarctic Expedition, 1907–09.

Mountains of Victoria Land
Scott Coast